Andrea Giacobazzi (died 1524) was a Roman Catholic prelate who served as Bishop of Nocera de' Pagani (1517–1524).

Biography
On 14 August 1517, Andrea Giacobazzi was appointed during the papacy of Pope Leo X as Bishop of Nocera de' Pagani.
He served as Bishop of Nocera de' Pagani until his death in 1524.

References

External links and additional sources
 (for Chronology of Bishops) 
 (for Chronology of Bishops) 

16th-century Italian Roman Catholic bishops
Bishops appointed by Pope Leo X
1524 deaths